Orange Blossom is a census-designated place (CDP) in Stanislaus County, California, United States. It is located along Orange Blossom Road in the northern part of the county, on the north side of the Stanislaus River. Orange Blossom was first listed as a CDP prior to the 2020 census.

References 

Census-designated places in Stanislaus County, California
Census-designated places in California